Athi may refer to:

People
 Athi Mafazwe (born 1997), South African cricket player
 Athi Mayinje, South African rugby player 
 Athi River (town), Kenya
 Athi-Patra Ruga (born 1984), South African artist

Places
 Athi, Kenya
 Athi River, part of the Athi-Galana-Sabaki River

Species
 Athi rufous-naped lark
 Athi elephant-snout fish
 Athi sardine
 Athi short-toed lark

Other
 Athi people
 Athi River Mining, also known as ARM Cement Limited
 Athi Veerapandiyan
 Athi Varadar